This is a list of ingredients found in Chilean cuisine which are mostly those used in Mediterranean and Andean cuisine.

Grains and maize
Wheat
Mote
Maize
Quinoa, a grain-like crop grown primarily for its edible seeds.

Legume
Bean

Meat

Beef
Charqui, a form of jerky common in South America made from dried and salted meat, usually horse, llama or beef.
Pork
Goose

Seafood
Cod
Crab
Juan Fernández lobster
Chilean mussel
Rainbow trout
Chilean sea urchin
Salmon
Centolla, a species of king crab, found off the Pacific coasts of South America
 Corvina - Chilean Sea Bass
Congrio, the family of conger and garden eels
Merluza, a family of cod-like fishes, including most hakes.
Loco, a species of large sea snail, a marine gastropod mollusk native to the coasts of Chile and Peru.
Picoroco, a species of giant barnacles native to the coasts of Chile and southern Peru.
Piure, a class in the Urochordata subphylum of sac-like marine invertebrate filter feeders.
Cochayuyo, algae

Dairy products
Milk (although rarely in fresh form in cities; long-life  milk is standard).

Vegetables
Potato
Chuño, a freeze-dried potato product
Chilean rhubarb
Sweet potato
Tomato
Artichoke
Basil
Cabbage
Carrot
Coriander
Garlic
Key lime
Onion

Fruits
Avocado
Magellan Barberry
Grape
Olive
Olive oil
Quince
Cherimoya, a fruit
Lúcuma, a subtropical fruit of Andean origin.
Mountain papaya, a fruit usually cooked as a vegetable, but is also eaten raw; like Papaya, it is rich in the digestive enzyme papain.
Murta, a shrub native to southern Chile. The fruit is a small red, white or purple berry 1 cm diameter with a strong strawberry flavour.
Piñón, The seeds are edible, similar to large pine nuts, and are extensively harvested in Chile.

Mushroom
Changle, fungi
Digüeñe, an orange-white coloured edible ascomycete fungus native to south-central Chile.

Herbs and spices
Boldo, herb
Matico
Yerba mate, grown in Paraguay, Argentina and Brazil.
Sugar cane
Merkén, It is a smoked and dried red hot chili pepper cacho cabra, which is ground into a powder.

See also
 
 

Chilean Ingredients
 
Ingredients